Ljustorps IF is a Swedish football club located in Ljustorp.

Background
Ljustorps IF currently plays in Division 4 Medelpad which is the sixth tier of Swedish football. They play their home matches at the Ljustorps IP in Ljustorp.

The club is affiliated to Medelpads Fotbollförbund.

Season to season

Footnotes

External links
 Ljustorps IF – Official website
 Ljustorps IF on Facebook

Football clubs in Västernorrland County
Association football clubs established in 2005